A brazier is a container to hold hot coals.

Brazier or Braziers may also refer to:
 a person who works brass
 Dairy Queen Brazier, a brand name of the hamburger sandwiches
 Brazier (name)
 Braziers, Ohio, a community in the United States
 Braziers Park, a manor house in Oxfordshire

See also 
 Brasier
 Brassiere
 Blazer (disambiguation)